Vendoconularia is a genus of Ediacaran organism consisting of a hexagonal cone, which is thought to have housed a tentaculate organism. Three longitudinal bands are interspersed between the six sides of the cone. The discovery of vendoconulariids in Proterozoic strata of Russia confirmed a 1987 prediction that conulariids constituted part of Ediacaran biota.

See also
 List of Ediacaran genera

References

Ediacaran life
Prehistoric cnidarian genera
Enigmatic animal taxa
Fossil taxa described in 2002